Eduard Theodor Ritter von Grützner (May 26, 1846 – April 2, 1925) was a German painter and professor of art. He was especially noted for his genre paintings of monks. He also repeatedly portrayed Falstaff.

Childhood
Grützner was born in 1846 into a noble family in Groß-Karlowitz near Neisse, Upper Silesia, Prussia (now Poland). His father was a prominent member of the church, and the local pastor often visited his parents' home. He recognized Eduard's talent and inclination for painting early on. The administrator of a ducal country house in the neighborhood got him paper, and eventually the pastor gained him entrance to the Gymnasium (a university preparatory school) of Neisse.

Studies
In 1864, the pastor brought Grützner to the private school of Hermann Dyck in Munich for art education, though his tenure at the Kunstgewerbeschule under Dyck was of short duration. In the first semester he transferred to the Classical Art class of Johann Georg Hiltensperger and Alexander Ströhuber, where the students learned about the aesthetic ideals of antiquity.

In 1865, Grützner joined the painting class of Hermann Anschütz at the Munich Academy. Meanwhile, he also sought advice and inspiration from Carl Theodor von Piloty; he was taken into Piloty's class in 1867.  Piloty's class included aspiring artists from Hungary, Greece, Germany, Russia, and Poland.  After three years under Piloty, Grützner left the academy.

Career
In 1870, Grützner moved into his own studio in the garden house of Schwanthalerstraße 18 in Munich. He quickly began to produce many paintings, and he became a very successful artist. It was reported by artist and writer Friedrich Pecht in the journal Die Kunst für Alle (Art for All) in 1886: "the painters Eduard Grützner and Ludwig Willroider were granted the title of 'professor' by Luitpold, Prince Regent of Bavaria". In 1880, he was awarded the Order of Merit of St. Michael (Knight's Cross) first class. He was knighted in 1916.

Art collector 
Grützner was an avid collector of art. Early on, he favored pieces from the German late Gothic and early Renaissance. In the last decade of his life, he turned from the late Middle Ages and collected art from the Far East. In his major compositions, however, he almost always included old pieces, mostly from his antique collection.

Family
In 1874, Grützner married Barbara Link. Two years later, they had a daughter named Barbara. In 1884, after ten years of marriage, his first wife died. In 1888, he became engaged to Anna Grützner Wirthmann, the daughter of a Munich garrison commander, and a short time later their son Karl Eduard was born. This second marriage was less harmonious and eventually his wife, who was seventeen years younger, left him for a Viennese singer.

In his old age he sought solace in Chinese philosophy, and began to collect items from the far east and learn Japanese. Occasionally he included a Buddha figure or a Chinese vase in some of his paintings. He also painted a number of ascetic-looking cardinals, often with harsh and unsympathetic features. He died on April 2, 1925, in Munich.

Legacy
Grützner was, along with Carl Spitzweg and Franz von Defregger, one of Munich's leading genre painters in the second half of the 19th century. Grützner's paintings are best known for their combination of detailed academic rendering with humorous and anecdotal subject matter.

Grützner was one of Hitler's favorite painters. Albert Speer quoted Hitler as saying that Grützner was "greatly underrated... Believe me, this Grützner will someday be worth as much as a Rembrandt. Rembrandt himself couldn't have painted that better."

See also
 List of German painters

Notes

References

Further reading
 Hector Feliciano, Le musée disparu, Gallimard, 2008 (French edition) p. 34.

External links

1846 births
1925 deaths
19th-century German painters
German male painters
20th-century German painters
20th-century German male artists
People from the Province of Silesia
Academy of Fine Arts, Munich alumni
Munich School
19th-century German male artists